is  the assistant coach of the Tokyo Excellence in the Japanese B.League.

Head coaching record

|-
| style="text-align:left;"|Tokyo Hachioji Trains
| style="text-align:left;"|2015-16
| 36||17||19|||| style="text-align:center;"|6th in NBDL|||-||-||-||
| style="text-align:center;"|-
|- 
| style="text-align:left;"|Tokyo Excellence
| style="background-color:#FFCCCC" "text-align:left;"|2016-17
| 60||22||38|||| style="text-align:center;"|4th in B2 Central|||-||-||-||
| style="text-align:center;"|Relegated to B3
|-

References

1984 births
Living people
Cyberdyne Ibaraki Robots coaches
Japanese basketball coaches
Tokyo Excellence coaches
Tokyo Hachioji Bee Trains coaches
Sportspeople from Osaka Prefecture